Aneesah Morrow (born February 2, 2003) is an American college basketball player for the DePaul Blue Demons. She was named the WBCA and USBWA National Freshman of the Year in 2022.

High school career
Morrow attended Simeon Career Academy in Chicago, where she helped lead the Wolverines to their first city championship her freshman year. During her junior year, she averaged 23 points, 12.1 rebounds and 3.6 assists, and led them to a 35–2 record and the girls basketball program's first state championship in 2020. In her senior year she averaged 28.4 points, 14.3 rebounds, 4.6 assists, 2.9 steals and 2.3 blocks per game. Following the season she was named an All-State first team selection by the Associated Press, Champaign News-Gazette and the Illinois Basketball Coaches Association (IBCA).

College career

Freshman season
Morrow began her collegiate career during the 2021–22 season. In her first career game on November 9, she recorded 31 points and nine rebounds against Texas Southern. She was subsequently named Big East Freshman of the Week. In the week of December 12 she earned her first United States Basketball Writers Association (USBWA) National Freshman of the Week honor following an 18-point, 17-rebound game in DePaul's 94–85 upset against then-No. 14 Kentucky. On January 30, she scored 22 points and recorded a Big East single-game record 27 rebounds, surpassing the previous record of 26 set by Peggy Walsh in 1986. In the regular-season finale on February 27 at Creighton, she scored a career-high 41 points and added 18 rebounds. The 41 points was a Big East rookie record, and one point shy of the program's all time single-game scoring record set by Beth Hasenmiller in 1991. She subsequently earned her record thirteenth Big East Freshman of the Week, and fifth National Freshman of Week honor, surpassing the previous record of four set by Caitlin Clark and Paige Bueckers.

She averaged a double-double with 21.9 points and 13.8 rebounds a game, and led the nation in total rebounds (457), rebounds per game (13.8) and offensive rebounds per game (5.8) and ranked second in the nation in double-doubles (27). She also had a streak of 23 consecutive double-doubles, which ended during the quarterfinals of the 2022 Big East tournament in a 85–105 loss to Marquette. She became the fifth player in NCAA women's basketball history to record more than 20 consecutive double-doubles in a season. Following an outstanding season, she was named a unanimous selection to the All-Big East first team, and All-Freshman team, and was named Big East Freshman of the Year. She was also named USBWA National Freshman of the Year, and WBCA Freshman of the Year. She was named a second-team All-American by Sports Illustrated, The Athletic, the Associated Press, and USBWA. She became the first All-American in program history.

Personal life
Morrow's father, Edward, played linebacker at Nebraska, while her mother, Nafeesah, was an all-conference forward for Nebraska.

References

External links
DePaul Blue Demons bio

Living people
2003 births
All-American college women's basketball players
American women's basketball players
Basketball players from Chicago
DePaul Blue Demons women's basketball players
Forwards (basketball)